Sha Tin Sports Ground is a multi-use stadium at 18 Yuen Wo Road, Sha Tin, Hong Kong. It is adjacent to the Shing Mun River. It is currently used mostly for football matches by Shatin Sports Association. The stadium holds 5,000.

Facilities
 Two covered grandstands
 Natural grass football pitch
 400 m running track
 Clock (unused)
 Two refreshment kiosks (one is unused)

Hong Kong First Division League
Shatin will use the sports ground as the home stadium in the 2009–10 season.

Gallery

References

External links
 Leisure and Cultural Services Department of Hong Kong - Sports grounds in Shatin

Football venues in Hong Kong
Sha Tin